Pongdong station is a railway station located in Pongsan County, North Hwanghae province, North Korea. It is on located on the P'yŏngbu Line, which was formed from part of the Kyŏngŭi Line to accommodate the shift of the capital from Seoul to P'yŏngyang; though this line physically connects P'yŏngyang to Pusan via Dorasan, in operational reality it ends at Kaesŏng due to the Korean Demilitarized Zone.

History

Although the Kyŏngŭi Line was originally opened on 3 April 1906, the station itself was opened by the Chosen Government Railway for passenger and freight service on 1 July 1923. The station was closed after the Korean War. The station, as well as the disused section from Kaesŏng across the DMZ to Dorasan, was rebuilt in 2003, and a special train inaugurating the reopened line ran on 17 May 2007. Regular freight service began between Dorasan and the Kaesŏng Industrial Region, and although passenger service for South Korean workers exists between Dorasan and the Kaesŏng Industrial Area, apart from the inaugural special train, there has been no passenger service to Sonha station. The freight and passenger services have been interrupted several times as a result of political events between North and South that have caused the closure of the industrial district; it was most recently reopened on 16 September 2013 after a five-month shutdown.

References

Railway stations in North Korea